The A630 autoroute is a motorway in south west France.  It is the bypass for Bordeaux, also called Rocade, and forms part of the European routes E5 E70.

It has 2 lanes each way and currently is being widened to 3 lanes. The construction of the bypass was started in 1972 and completed in 1983, however works on the Bridge of Aquitaine started in 1961. It was completed in 1993 with the opening of the section between the François Mitterrand Bridge and the RD936.

Junctions

Listed counter-clockwise:
Interchange N230-A10-A630 Junction with A10 to Paris, Poitiers and N230.
01 (Cenon-Artigues) Areas served: Cenon, Artigues
02 (Bordeaux-Bastides) Areas served: Lormont, Port et ZI d'Ambès, ZI Bec d'Ambès, Carbon-Blanc, Bassens 
03  (Vieux Lormont) Closed 
Pont d'Aquitaine 
Speed Radar (Limit: 70 km/h) 
04 (Bordeaux-Centre) Areas served: Parc des expositions, Bordeaux-Lac, ZI Blanquefort, Bordeaux-North, Bordeaux City Centre, Bruges-Le Tasta 
05  (Bordeaux-Fret) Areas served: Bordeaux-Fret,  ZI Bruges 
06  (Bruges) Areas served: Bruges, Blanquefort, ZI Campilleau 
07  (Eysines-Le Vigean) Areas served: Le Taillan-Médoc, Le Bouscat, Eysines-Le Vigean, Médoc 
08  (Le Verdon) Areas served: Lacanau, Eysines, St Médard en J., Le Verdon
09  (Le Haillan) Areas served: Bordeaux-Caudéran, Mérignac-Capeyron, St Médard en J., Le Haillan 
10  (Mérignac-Centre) Areas served: Andernos, Cap-Ferret, Mérignac-Pichey/Centre
Speed Radar (Limit 90 km/h) 
11a  (Parc d'activités) Areas served: Centre Hôtelier, Parc d'activités
11b  (Aéroport) Areas served Bordeaux Airport, Mérignac, Mérignac-Chemin Long 
12  (St-Jean) Areas served: Saint-Jean-d'Illac, Parc Cimetière 
13 (Pessac-Centre) Towns served: Pessac-L'Alouette 
14  (Pessac-Saige) Towns served: ZI Pessac, Hôpitaux Haut-Lêveque Xavier Arzonan 
Interchange A630-A63 Junction with the A63 to Arcachon, Mont-de-Marsan, Bayonne, San Sebastián, Canéjan, Cestas, Spain 
16  (Gradignan-Centre) Towns served: Gradignan, Talence, Domaine Universitaire 
17  (Talence) Areas served: Talence, Thouars, Gradignan, Malartic 
18a (Léognan) Areas served: Cadaujac, Villenave-d'Ornon, Pont de la Maye 
18b (Villenave) Areas served: Villenave-Centre, Pont de La Maye 
Interchange A630-A62 Junction with A62 to Toulouse, Pau, Agen 
20  (Bègles) Areas served: Cadaujac, Bègles 
Speed Radar (Limit 90 km/h) 
21  (Bordeaux-Centre) Areas served: City Centre, St Jean Railway Station, A631 spur to docks and City Centre. 
Road becomes the RN230 over the Pont François Mitterrand (Pont d'Arcins) 
22  (Latresne-Floirac-La Souys) 
23  (Bouillac) Areas served: Floirac-Centre, Bouillac 
24  (Bergerac) Areas served: Bergerac, Tresses, Haut-Floirac 
25  (Artigues) Areas served: Artigues-Centre, Cenon, ZI Artigues 
26  (Libourne) Areas served: N89, Libourne, Périgueux, Yvrac 
27  (Lormont) Areas served: Lormont, Carbon-Blanc
Interchange N230-A10-A630 Junction with A10 to Paris, Poitiers and A630.

External links

 A630 Motorway in Saratlas

A630